Skirl Records is an American record label in Brooklyn, New York, that concentrates on improvised music. The label was started by Chris Speed in 2006.

Roster
 
 Jim Black
 Shelley Burgon
 Anthony Burr
 Andrew D'Angelo
 Trevor Dunn
 Devin Gray
 Mary Halvorson
 Curtis Hasselbring
 Arnold Hammerschlag
 Doug Hendersen
 John Hollenbeck
 Human Feel
 Hilmar Jensson
 Simon Jermyn
 Travis Laplante
 Oscar Noriega
 Jessica Pavone
 Ben Perowsky
 Ted Reichman
 Zeno De Rossi
 Ches Smith
 Sean Sonderegger
 Chris Speed
 Andy Taub
 Anna Webber

See also 
 List of record labels

References

External links
  Official site

American record labels
Alternative rock record labels
Jazz record labels
Record labels established in 2006